KD Air Corporation was an airline based in Qualicum Beach, British Columbia, Canada, offering both scheduled and charter service. The airline ceased operations in 2019 and according to Transport Canada the airline currently has no aircraft and no air operator's certificate.

Destinations
KD Air operated daily flights between 
Qualicum Beach
Vancouver 
Tofino 
Texada Island
Port Alberni Ground Service from Qualicum Beach.

Fleet
The KD Air fleet consisted of:
Piper PA-31 Navajo
Piper PA-31-350 Chieftain
Piper PA-32-260 Cherokee Six

See also
 History of aviation in Canada
 List of defunct airlines of Canada

References

External links

KD Air official site

Regional airlines of British Columbia
Defunct airlines of Canada